The A7 is a major road, partly a trunk road, that connects Edinburgh in Central Scotland to Carlisle in North West England. The A7 meets the M6 motorway close to Carlisle, which connects to the English motorway network.

Route description

Edinburgh to Hawick

The northern terminus of the A7 is the junction at North Bridge with Princes Street in Edinburgh, also the northern terminus of the A1 and the southern terminus of the A900. The road passes Cameron Toll, before meeting the Edinburgh City Bypass at the Sheriffhall Roundabout. South of the bypass, the A7 continues through Midlothian past Newtongrange and Gorebridge. Continuing from Midlothian into the Scottish Borders, the road bypasses Heriot then passes through Stow to reach Galashiels. The A7 becomes a trunk road at the southern boundary of Galashiels. It continues south to Selkirk; a bypass here has been proposed for years but not implemented. This section of the A7 runs parallel to the Borders Railway which opened in 2015; Network Rail and MPs met during construction to mitigate the effect of works traffic on the road.

Hawick to Langholm

In Hawick the A7 continues along the north bank of the River Teviot to cross the river at the Albert Bridge and follows the south bank of the river towards Langholm, then bypasses Canonbie. South of Langholm the road has been improved, allowing for overtaking.

England

Continuing across the English border, the A7 goes through Longtown, before meeting the A689 and the M6 at the Greymoorhill Roundabout. The A7 becomes a dual carriageway close to the Kingstown Industrial Estate on the northern fringe of Carlisle. Continuing as a single carriageway road, the A7 crosses the River Eden over Eden Bridge. At Hardwicke Circus Roundabout in the centre of Carlisle, the A7 meets the A595 to the west and southern Cumbria, then continues to form part of Carlisle's one way system through the city centre, meeting the A69 and finally becoming the A6 near Carlisle railway station. The English section was detrunked in 2005.

Safety
In the late 1970s, the A7 was described as being slow and tortuous. It was the 28th most dangerous UK road in 2017. The A7 Action Group was founded in 1990, and continues to lobby for safety improvements to the road, including a bypass of Selkirk.

Major junctions
Note: Junctions are listed northbound from Carlisle to Edinburgh.

See also
British road numbering scheme

References

External links

Roads in Cumbria
Roads in Scotland
Transport in Dumfries and Galloway
Transport in Edinburgh
Transport in Midlothian
Transport in the Scottish Borders